The chestnut owlet (Glaucidium capense castaneum) is a subspecies of owl  to the African barred owlet in the family Strigidae. It is found in west and central Africa in two allopatric subspecies that possibly could be classified as separate species.

Description
The chestnut owlet is a small owlet which is rather similar to the African barred owlet, which is larger. The adult chestnut owlet has a brown facial disk which is marked with dark bars and flecks and whitish eyebrows. The upperparts are chestnut with a white spotted crown and a white shoulder line formed by the outer wens of the scapulars. The paler underparts are marked with dense barring on the breast, with spots on the rest of the underparts. The eyes are yellow, the cere and bill are greenish yellow, the legs are feathered and the toes are dirty yellow but rather bristly.

Distribution and subspecies 
This bird is closely related to the African barred owlet and is considered a subspecies.

Habits and habitat

The biology of the chestnut owlet is little known but like the related African barred owlet it is partly diurnal. Like other owls it will be mobbed by small passerines if discovered at its roost. Its prey is small vertebrates and arthropods, which are either caught from a perch or gleaned from the foliage.

References

chestnut owlet
Birds of Central Africa
Birds of West Africa
chestnut owlet
Taxonomy articles created by Polbot